The Painted Rock Dam is an earthfill embankment dam located west of Gila Bend, Arizona.  It is primarily used for flood control purposes.

Description
The Painted Rock Dam was constructed during a 3-year period from 1957–1960 by the United States Army Corps of Engineers to help control seasonal floods on the lower reaches of the Gila River. The river had no significant impediments between the Colorado River and the Coolidge Dam hundreds of miles upstream. In this stretch the river receives several tributaries, including the Hassayampa, Agua Fria rivers, and most importantly the Salt River and its major tributary, the Verde River.

The area surrounding the dam has also hosted a number of historical events.  The Butterfield Overland Mail route passed through the area, as did the path followed by the Mormon Battalion.  Evidence of both can be found, as well as the expedition of Juan Bautista De Anza in 1774.  Inscriptions made by these groups can be found in various sites in the region.

Near the dam site, there is also a campground maintained by the Bureau of Land Management that showcases a number of prehistoric petroglyphs, indicating human involvement in the region long predating Western influence.  It is from the Painted Rock Petroglyph Site that the area and the dam get their names.

The lake and reservoir are dry as of August 2009 and are closed to the public due to contamination of pesticide run off. This is in stark contrast to the level of upkeep during the 1990s. The state was forced to abandon the campground and the area is now marked as "NO TRESPASSING". No hunting, hiking, or camping is allowed.  The Army Corps of Engineers now maintains the property.

Painted Rock Reservoir
The Painted Rock Reservoir is an artificial reservoir impounded by the Painted Rock Dam.

In 2005, heavy runoff filled the reservoir to record levels, swelling the lake to become the second largest by area in the state of Arizona, trailing only Theodore Roosevelt Lake.  However, extremely high levels of pesticides, particularly the now-banned DDT, had built up in the farmlands upstream from the reservoir in the decades prior and accumulated in the lake during the flood.  The extreme toxicity of the lake rendered it unsuitable for recreational uses and public access to both the lake and the dam was restricted.  Similar runoff had filled the lake previously in 1993 and 1980, and in each instance the lake persisted only a few months before emptying due to losses through evaporation, downstream releases, and infiltration.

Displacement of Native Americans
Water impounded by the Painted Rock Dam caused the flooding of about 10,000 acres of the Tohono O'odham's Gila Bend Reservation.  The flooding destroyed a 750-acre tribal farm and several communities.  Residents were relocated to a 40-acre parcel called San Lucy Village, Arizona. In 1986, the federal government and the Nation approved a settlement in which the Nation agreed to give up its legal claims in exchange for $30,000,000 and the right to add up to 10,000 acres of newly purchased land to its Reservation.

See also

 Painted Rock Petroglyph Site

References

External links

Gila River
Dams in Arizona
Reservoirs in Maricopa County, Arizona
United States Army Corps of Engineers dams
Dams completed in 1960
Reservoirs in Arizona